The Moscow State University of Medicine and Dentistry is a leading university for dentistry in Russia. The university's history dates back to the emergence of dental schools in Russia in the 19th century.

History

Establishment 

The history of Moscow State University of Medicine and Dentistry (MSUMD) dates back to the 19th century, when the first dental school was opened in Moscow by I.M. Kovarsky. Later, when the Soviets came to power in Russia, it was turned into the House of Soviet Dentistry.

Early Soviet years

In February 1920, when the Kovarsky dental school went under the jurisdiction of Narkomzdrav (the People's Commissariat of Health), the Kovarsky school was transformed into a dental research center by the decision of Narkomzdrav's dental health division in order to bring together all dental care units that existed at the time in different parts of Moscow — a demonstration dispensary, a chemical laboratory, and the Kovarsky institution itself. The center was named the House of Soviet Dentistry (HSD) and among its main purposes were the retraining of former dentists into oral care consultants, and the preparation of secondary dental personnel, such as dental mechanics, filling and prosthetic specialists, and chair side assistants. 

First renamed in December, 1920, the HSD's official opening took place two years later in April 1922, when again it was given a different name. This time it was the State Institute of Dentistry (SID), which was to be headed by M.В. Yankovsky, who directed his staff in an in-depth study of Dentistry and Odontology before anything else; the two major problems to be solved were tooth decay and periodontal disease. Another new name, that of the State Institute of Stomatology and Odontology (SISO) was given in April 1927 by decree of the Sovnarkom (the Soviet government). In 1932, the SISO was renamed yet again, this time to the State Research Institute of Stomatology and Odontology (SRISO) and from then on it was concerned mostly with scientific research problems.

Years as Moscow Stomatological Institute 

The Moscow Stomatological Institute (MSI) as a higher dental school was established under the Narkomzdrav's order dated June 9, 1935, as a subdivision within the SRISO's framework. Both institutions were housed in one building, sharing administration, finances and facilities. In line with the resolution of the RSFSR Narkomzdrav of September 1, 1939, the SRISO and MSI were united to become the Moscow State Stomatology Institute (MSSI) with associate professor D. S. Dyshlis as Director. That year witnessed the first batch of 79 graduates trained by the new institution. In the first days of the war, the MSSI's 1941 graduates were called up to serve in the Red Army or Navy. On October 1, 1943, the Moscow State Stomatology Institute opened its doors to students again and about a year later, in February, 1944, A.I.  Yevdokimov was appointed its director.

After World War II and Khrushchev Thaw 

After the war the training of dental care professionals became vital again. So on October 15, 1949, by decision of the USSR Council of Ministers, former dental schools were reorganized into general medicine and dentistry institutes with a 5-year course of studies. The Moscow State Stomatology Institute was again renamed to become the Moscow Medical Stomatology Institute (MMSI). From 1964 to 1965, the institute was headed by Prof A.I. Doimkov. From 1965 to 1968, the post of Rector of the MMSI was held by Professor S.I. Babichev, head of the institute's Surgical Disease department. He initiated the idea of incorporating a General Medicine Faculty into the MMSI.

Brezhnev years and Perestroika 

During the period of time from 1968 to 1974, when the institute was headed by prof. A.Z. Belousov, the proposal of setting up a general medicine faculty won his support and was realized in 1968. The emergence of the new faculty that was to cater for the need in medical professionals by the city of Moscow and its surroundings called for employment of more teaching staff for a number of the existing departments (those of Foreign Languages, Anatomy, Physiology, Biology, Histology, Physics and General Chemistry, Microbiology and Pharmacology and others) as well as for putting up new courses and departments. These were launched a year later, staffed with qualified specialists and office workers that helped improve the work of the Faculty's administration and dean's offices. That same year, the MMSI opened an advanced training faculty for medical professionals with departments for dental and general practitioners, which was followed by opening in 1975 of a faculty for advanced training of teaching staff. From 1974 to 1982, Professor К.M. Lakin, corresponding member of the USSR Academy of Medical Sciences, headed the institution.

In modern Russia 

The decades that followed (1982 to 2002) saw Professor Ye.I. Sokolov as the Rector. Towards the end of the decade, another change of name was in store for the Institution, this time by the orders of the Ministries for General and Vocational Education and that for Public Health of the Russian Federation, dated June 10, 1999. These granted the MMSI a university status with a full name from then on of Moscow State University of Medicine and Dentistry (MSUMD) under the Russian Ministry of Public Health.

Rector of the University 

During the five years after Professor Ye.I. Sokolov's resignation in 2002, the University was led by Professor N.D. Yushchuk, a RAS and RAMS academician, RF Honored Scientist, government prize winner, head of the University's Infectious Disease and Epidemiology department. On May 15, 2007, Professor O.O. Yanushevich, head of the MSMDU Periodontology and Geriatric Dentistry department, was elected rector in a ballot by a university staff meeting that was also unanimous in voting for the former rector, academician N.D. Yuschuk, as the University President.

Notable faculty 

 Anatoly Sharpenak (1895 - 1969) - scholar and biochemist, Professor. In 1939, he founded the Department of Biological Chemistry, and was the head of the department until 1969. He was then replaced by the founder of one of the theories of the origin and development of dental caries, known as Sharpenak's theory.
 Yakov Kahn, MD - professor of Urology.

Degree mill 
According to the research performed by the Dissernet community, the university has multiple (>95) cases of Ph.D. level degrees being awarded on the basis of plagiarised theses.

References

External links 

Gurevich, K.G., Fabrikant, E. G., Rabinovich,  S. A. System of research staff training in Moscow state university of medicine and dentistry. ORPHEUS 2009. Fourth European Conference. Setting Standards for PhD Education in Biomedicine and Health Sciences. Aarhus, 23-25 April 2009, Aarhus University, Denmark

1922 establishments in Russia
Dental schools
Educational institutions established in 1922
Medical schools in Russia
Universities in Moscow